Todd Wilson Agnew (born March 15, 1971, in Dallas, Texas) is a contemporary Christian musician and songwriter.

Musical career
Agnew's best-known song is "Grace Like Rain", a version of "Amazing Grace", which was featured on his first album, Grace Like Rain, released in June 2003. Agnew wrote this song with his friend, Chris Collins. Since then, Agnew has released five label albums. 2005's Reflection of Something introduced the popular songs "My Jesus" and "Unchanging One", which are often featured on Contemporary Christian radio stations. In late 2006, after the two highly acclaimed studio projects, he wrote a retelling of the Christmas story on his album entitled Do You See What I See?. His fourth studio project, Better Questions, was released in 2007 and featured the hit single "Our Great God" (a duet featuring CCM artist Rebecca St. James).

Agnew is known for performing his concerts barefoot.

Personal life
Agnew was born in Dallas, Texas to a Native American mother. He was adopted at birth by a white couple (which was legal at the time in 1971, before the ICWA was instituted), and thus, did not grow up being influenced by his cultural heritage. He was raised in Dallas, Texas. Agnew began traveling to Memphis to help Andy Savage with a citywide Bible study for college students and singles called Metro Bible study in the fall of 1999 at Germantown Baptist Church.  During this time he began writing and introducing songs to the group which would later become songs on the album, Grace Like Rain. He would eventually move to Memphis to help Chris Conlee and Savage plant a church, which developed through the Metro event, called Highpoint Church.

On September 18, 2007, at the final concert of his Better Questions Tour in Memphis, TN, Agnew proposed to his longtime girlfriend. After a number of years touring out of Memphis, Agnew moved back to Texas; he currently lives in Austin, TX with his wife and two children.

Live band members
Current
 Sam Weaver – guitar
 Brian Wilson – drums
 Cody Spriggs – bass
 Chris Farnsworth – road manager/sound man
Former
 Jonathan Chu – violin (last performance with band August 30, 2008)
 Rob Ramsey – guitar (last performance with band August 30, 2008)

Discography

Awards and nominations

In 2007, Do You See What I See? was nominated for a Dove Award for Christmas Album of the Year at the 38th GMA Dove Awards. He has been nominated for six additional Dove Awards including New Artist of the Year, Rock/Contemporary Recorded Song of the Year and Rock/Contemporary Album of the Year.

References

External links
 
 [ Todd Agnew] at AllMusic
 Todd Agnew at PureVolume
 inside the heart and mind of todd agnew: an interview – BibleDude.net

Living people
1971 births
Singer-songwriters from Texas
American male singer-songwriters
American performers of Christian music
American people of Native American descent
21st-century American male singers
21st-century American singers